Antal Hajba (16 January 1938 – 5 March 2017) was a Hungarian sprint canoeist who competed in the mid-1960s. He won the gold medal in the C-1 10000 m event at the 1966 ICF Canoe Sprint World Championships in East Berlin.

Hajba also finished fourth in the C-2 1000 m event at the 1964 Summer Olympics in Tokyo.

References

External links

Sports-reference.com profile

1938 births
2017 deaths
Canoeists at the 1964 Summer Olympics
Hungarian male canoeists
Olympic canoeists of Hungary
ICF Canoe Sprint World Championships medalists in Canadian
20th-century Hungarian people